Dyme is a Dutch fintech start-up and subscription management app that allows users to cancel and renegotiate their recurring costs. In 2019, Dyme was the first independent Dutch company to receive a PSD2 licence from the Netherlands' central bank (DNB). Wired described Dyme as one of the ‘hottest start-ups in Europe’ in 2021. It is reported the company had 350,000 registered users in the Netherlands and Great Britain in 2021.

History
Dyme was founded in 2018 by Joran Iedema, David Knap, David Schogt and Wouter Florijn. The four had previously founded Cycleswap, a bicycle rental platform launched in 2015 and sold to the American platform Spinlister in 2016.
The company gained notability in the Netherlands in 2020 when it appeared on Dutch television in Dragons Den, where Pieter Schoen made a €750,000 bid in an attempt to acquire 51.01% of the company. Dyme's Joran Iedema rejected the deal.

References 

Financial technology companies
Dutch companies established in 2018
Mobile applications